Ganiang is a township of Yuanyang County, Honghe Prefecture, Yunnan. Ganiang Village, Shuijingwan Village, Dawu Village, Jijudi Village, Longke Village, Fenggang Village and Kulu Village are located in Ganiang.

References 

Township-level divisions of Honghe Hani and Yi Autonomous Prefecture
Yuanyang County, Yunnan